South Dhannapur is a village in Mohammadpur Union, Chatkhil Upazila, Noakhali District, Chittagong Division, Bangladesh. According to the 2011 Bangladesh census, Dhannapur had 228 households and a population of 1,207.

History
During the Bangladesh Liberation War of 1971, some of the people of this village were freedom fighters such as Muhammad Abul Khayr ibn Zaynul Abidin and Muhammad Abul Hashim ibn Ali Miah. Abdul Matin ibn Sikandar Miah is a notable Bangladesh Nationalist Party politician from South Dhannapur.

Facilities
It is in close proximity to the Palla Bazar marketplace. There is an eidgah in the south side of the village. The Sunrise Community Welfare Council is a local charity operating in Southern Dhannapur.

References

Villages in Noakhali District